Axa is a French insurance company. It may also refer to:

 Axa (comics), a comic strip by  Donne Avenell and Romero, about Axa, a barbarian woman of the future
 Alpha Chi Alpha, a fraternity at Dartmouth College
 Anguilla, a British Overseas Territory in the Caribbean
 AXA, IATA code for the Clayton J. Lloyd International Airport in Anguilla
 AXA Home Security, a Dutch manufacturer of locks and bicycle lights

See also
 Al-Aqsa (disambiguation)